Manu Lima is a Senegalese-born Cape Verdean author, composer, interpreter and musician, he sings cabo-zouk, funaná, cabo love, cola-dance, afrozouk and kizomba music genres.

He was born in Dakar, Senegal.  He was a member of a Capeverdean music group titled Cabo Verde Show.

He also produced three albums for Gabonese Zouk musician, Oliver N'Goma.

Manu Lima currently resides in Europe.

Discography
With the Cabo Verde Show
Bêju cu Jêtu - originally by René Cabral
Bo Ca Tem Mas
Bo Ca Sabe
P.A.I.
Joana
Mansinha
Casa Ma Um Criola
Criol Inganadu
Tetesha

With Oliver N'Goma
Bane (1990)
Adia (1995)
Saga (2006)

See also
Music of Cape Verde

References

External links
Cabo Verde Show at Myspace

20th-century Cape Verdean male singers
People from Dakar
Senegalese expatriates in Cape Verde
Kizomba singers
Year of birth missing (living people)
Living people